The 1992 Meistriliiga was the inaugural season of the Meistriliiga, the top division of the Estonian football. It was the first domestic competition since the Baltic nation had gained independence from the Soviet Union in 1991. Fourteen teams competed in this edition, played in the spring to make the transition to autumn to spring season in the same year. Norma Tallinn won the title.

Preliminary round

Western Group

Results

Eastern Group

Results

Championship Tournament

League table

Results

Relegation Tournament

League table

Results

Relegation playoff

4–4 on aggregate. Merkuur won on away goals and retained its Meistriliiga spot for the 1992-93 season.

Top scorers

See also
1992 in Estonian football
1992–93 Esiliiga

References

Estonia - List of final tables (RSSSF)

Meistriliiga seasons
1
Estonia